Sammy Gyamfi (28 March 1989) is a Ghanaian lawyer and politician. He is the current National Communications Officer for the National Democratic Congress

Education 
Sammy Gyamfi had his secondary education at the St. James Seminary Secondary School. He later went to the Kwame Nkrumah University of Science and Technology for his first degree.

Politics 
In 2018 stood for National Communications Officer during the National Democratic Congress's national executive elections and won by beating his only contender the then Deputy Communication Director of the Party Fred Agbenyo by 4,000 votes. He got 6,225 out of  9,000 votes cast whilst his contender Fred Agbenyo got 2,225 votes. He was again re-elected in 2022 for another four years as a National Communications Officer of the National Democratic Congress.

Personal life 
Sammy Gyamfi is a Christian and he is married.

References

Living people
1989 births
National Democratic Congress (Ghana) politicians
Kwame Nkrumah University of Science and Technology alumni
St. James Seminary Senior High School alumni
21st-century Ghanaian lawyers